Rubidium sulfide is an inorganic compound and a salt with the chemical formula Rb2S. It is a white solid with similar properties to other alkali metal sulfides.

Production 
By dissolving hydrogen sulfide into rubidium hydroxide solution, it will produce rubidium bisulfide, followed by rubidium sulfide.

Properties

Physical properties 
Rubidium sulfide has a cubic crystal similar to lithium sulfide, sodium sulfide and potassium sulfide, known as the anti-fluorite structure. Rubidium sulfide has a crystal lattice unit cell dimension of = 765.0 pm.

Chemical properties 
Rubidium sulfide reacts with sulfur in hydrogen gas to form rubidium pentasulfide, Rb2S5.

References 

Rubidium compounds
Sulfides
Fluorite crystal structure